Coffeeville is the name of four settlements in the United States:
Coffeeville, Alabama
Coffeeville, Arkansas
Coffeeville, Mississippi
Coffeeville, Texas

The Coffeeville Dam and lock on the Tombigbee River in Alabama also take the name.

See also
Coffeyville, Kansas
Caffeyville, Missouri